Paata Shamugia (in Georgian: პაატა შამუგია) – the most influential and provocative contemporary Georgian poet. His texts, according to Georgian literary scholars, comprise a high amount of self-irony and sometimes, even weird linguistic performances as well. In 2015 year he became the first Georgian poet to get the most prestigious SABA literary prize twice.

After publishing his début poem "Panther's Skin" in 2006 in 2006 (in which author countered so-called "Georgian Bible" "The knight in the panther's skin"), he gained wide popularity in Georgian public. During several months in the Georgian press and TV people had disputed around this book. Even the Georgian parliament members demanded to ban the book because of its “harmful behavior” and disrespect of the tradition. The members of the Radical Orthodox Parents’ Union published a letter dedicated to Shamugia
in the newspaper “Asaval-Dasavali”, in which they asked to Georgian Orthodox Church to pronounce him an anathema.

In 2010 Paata Shamugia published book "Preference", Was commended by the critics and estimated as an author's best book.

In 2015 year publishing-house INTELEKTI published Paata Shamugia's famous book SCHIZO-NATIONAL ANTHEMS, which brought him most prestigious literary prize of Georgia for the second time. The Greek translation of SCHIZO-NATIONAL ANTHEMS became a Greek bestseller and the Greek Esquire included it among the 10 favorite books of the Greek reader.

As a literary critic and poet, George Lobjanidze has mentioned, "Paata Shamugia's poetry is the most adequate for the reality of today, because no one reader remains indifferent toward his texts. For some people - and mostly for his peers or the younger generations - Paata is an idol. Some strongly believes he's a mason, godless, anti traditional etc..."

"One can randomly open SCHIZO-NATIONAL ANTHEMS at any page and find an inspiring quotation - an influential social message, slogan, motto - as the best sample of intertextuality; as  an innovative, quite an unusual product born between poetic and mathematic logics" - Poet and literary critic Shota Iatashvili has emphasized in his review.

Biography 
Paata Shamugia was born in Georgia (country), Abkhazia, Graduated from the philological faculty at Tbilisi state university. Since 2018 year Paata Shamugia was a president of The Georgian PEN Georgia.

Shamugia's poems are translated in more than 20 languages.

Rewards 
2012 - Paata Shamugia won SABA - the most prestigious literary award of Georgia and his book ACATISTE was named as the best book of the year.

2012 - The Art magazine HOT CHOCOLATE named Paata Shamugia the person of the Year.

2015 - Paata Shamugia won SABA literary prize for the second time - and his book SCHIZO-NATIONAL ANTHEMS was named as the best book of the year.

1983 births
Living people
21st-century male writers
21st-century poets from Georgia (country)
Male poets from Georgia (country)